Rajan Saxena was born on 01-03- in Lucknow and is Dean and Head of the  Department of Surgical Gastroenterology at Sanjay Gandhi Postgraduate Institute of Medical Sciences, Lucknow, a medical institution of national importance in India and Padma Shri (2004) awardee. He is an alumnus of the Postgraduate Institute of Medical Education and Research, and specialises in hepatobiliary pancreatic and liver transplant surgery.

References 

Living people
Indian gastroenterologists
Recipients of the Padma Shri in medicine
20th-century Indian medical doctors
Year of birth missing (living people)